The Mixed team relay road cycling event at the 2016 Summer Paralympics took place on the afternoon of 14 September at Flamengo Park, Pontal. 5 teams of three, all using hancycles, took part.

The H category is for cyclists with lower limb deficiencies.

Results : Mixed Relay

14 September 2016, Rio.

References

Cycling at the 2016 Summer Paralympics